Cymbopetalum penduliflorum is a species of plant in family Annonaceae.

Common names include "sacred earflower". In the Guatemalan municipality of Todos Santos Cuchumatán it is called  in the Mam language. It is called  by the Qʼeqchiʼ in the area of Cobán.

The plant grows as a tree or small shrub with distichous, subsessile, oblanceolate leaves.  It has solitary flowers borne on long slender peduncles coming from the internodes of the smaller branches.  Its sepals are broadly ovate or suborbicular, cuspidate, reflexed at length,  The outer petals are similar, but are much larger than the sepals. The inner petals are thick and fleshy with an involute margin that causes them to resemble a human ear.  When fresh, the pungent flowers are greenish-yellow with the inner surface of the inner petals tending towards orange, at length turning brownish-purple or maroon, breaking with a bright orange fracture.

The dried flowers of C. penduliflorum and related species C. costaricense were traditionally used to give a spicy flavor to chocolate before the arrival of cinnamon and the other Old World spices.  The dried petals are still used to in atoles, pinoles, and coffee.

It is native to mountainous areas of southern Mexico, Guatemala, and El Salvador.  It is still cultivated as a spice in the Guatemalan regions around Cobán and Jacaltenango and sold in markets in those areas as well as Antigua Guatemala, Santa Ana, El Salvador, and San Andrés Tuxtla, Mexico.

References

penduliflorum
Spices
Inflorescence vegetables
Plants described in 1868
Chocolate
Taxa named by Martín Sessé y Lacasta
Taxa named by José Mariano Mociño
Taxa named by Michel Félix Dunal
Taxa named by Henri Ernest Baillon